Borstal Boy may refer to: 

 Borstal Boy, an autobiographical novel published in 1958 by Brendan Behan
 Borstal Boy (play), the 1967 play adaptation by playwright Frank McMahon 
 Borstal Boy (film), the 2000 film adaptation by screenwriters Nye Heron and Peter Sheridan